LY-367,265 is a drug developed by Eli Lilly, which acts as both a potent and selective antagonist at the serotonin 5-HT2A receptor, and also a selective serotonin reuptake inhibitor (SSRI). It has antidepressant effects in animal studies, reduces glutamate signalling in the brain and increases the analgesic effects of morphine.

References 

5-HT2A antagonists
Selective serotonin reuptake inhibitors
Eli Lilly and Company brands